LS Group is a South Korean chaebol (conglomerate) mostly in electrics, electricity, materials and energy sectors. It is composed of LS Corp. (see below), E1 (LPG), and YESCO (LNG).   "LS Corp." is a holding company, which comprises LS Cable & System (power & communications cables), LS ELECTRIC (electrical equipment & automation systems), LS-Nikko Copper (copper smelter & refiner) and LS Mtron (machinery & components).  The company is controlled by the Koo family, the founding family of LG Group.

LS Group was spun off from LG Group in 2003.

Group families
 LS Corp 
 LS Cable & System (LS Cable & System, GCI, Alutek, Pountek, Kospace, LS Global, etc.)
 Gaon Cable (Gaon Cable, Weduss)
 LS ELECTRIC (Formerly LS Industrial Systems / LG Industrial Systems) (LS IS, LS Metal, Planet, LS Mecapion, LS Sauter, LS Power Semitech, Trino)
 LS MnM (Formerly LS-Nikko Copper)  (LS MnM, GRM, Torecom, Recytech Korea, Wahchang, Sunwo)
 LS Mtron (Daesung Electric/Deltech, Casco, Nongaon Gyeongju, Nongaon Pyeongtaek)
 E1 (E1, E1 Logistics, E1 Container Terminal, Dongbang City Gas)
 LS Networks (Prospecs)
 YESCO (YESCO, YESCO Service, Daehan GM, Hansung Group)
 LS I&D (Superior Essex)

See also
LG Group
GS Group

References

External links
 

Chaebol
Electronics companies established in 1936
Manufacturing companies established in 1936